Wicklow was a constituency representing the parliamentary borough of Wicklow in the Irish House of Commons to 1800.

Members of Parliament
1613–1615 Sir William Ussher and Sir Laurence Esmonde
1634–1635 William Ussher and James Byrne
1639–1649 Richard Parsons (died and replaced in 1642 by John Hill. Hill then died and was replaced in 1645 by Joshua Carpenter) and John Hoey
1661–1665 Robert Shapcote and Roger Sotheby

1689–1801

References

Constituencies of the Parliament of Ireland (pre-1801)
Historic constituencies in County Wicklow
Wicklow (town)
1800 disestablishments in Ireland
Constituencies disestablished in 1800